Turtulla may refer to:
 
Turtulla, Fertiana, County Tipperary, a townland in Fertiana civil parish in North Tipperary
Turtulla, Thurles, County Tipperary, a townland in Thurles civil parish in North Tipperary